The National Spatial Reference System (NSRS), managed by the National Geodetic Survey (NGS), is a coordinate system that includes latitude, longitude, elevation, and other values. The NSRS consists of a National Shoreline, the NOAA CORS Network (a system of Global Positioning System Continuously Operating Reference Stations), a network of permanently marked points, and a set of models that describe dynamic geophysical processes affecting spatial measurements. Pre-2022, the system is based on NAD 83 and NAVD 88.

In 2022, the NSRS will be modernized with a focus on GNSS and geoid use. It will use the following four frames of reference, each representing a tectonic plate:
North American Terrestrial Reference Frame of 2022 (NATRF2022)
Pacific Terrestrial Reference Frame of 2022 (PTRF2022)
Caribbean Terrestrial Reference Frame of 2022 (CTRF2022)
Mariana Terrestrial Reference Frame of 2022 (MTRF2022)

Datum of 2022

The Datum of 2022 is a placeholder name for a new geodetic datum set to be produced by the U.S. National Geodetic Survey in 2024-2025 to improve the National Spatial Reference System (NSRS) by replacing the North American Datum of 1983 (NAD 83) and the North American Vertical Datum of 1988 (NAVD 88) with a new geometric reference frame and geopotential datum.

The new reference frames will rely primarily on Global Navigation Satellite Systems (GNSS), such as the Global Positioning System (GPS), as well as on a gravimetric geoid model resulting from NGS' Gravity for the Redefinition of the American Vertical Datum (GRAV-D) Project.

These new reference frames are intended be easier to access and to maintain than NAD 83 and NAVD 88, which rely on physical survey marks that deteriorate over time.

See also
 Altitude
 Geodesy
 Sea Level Datum of 1929
 Topographic elevation
 Topography
 Reference ellipsoid
 Geoid

References 
Attribution: contains public domain material copied from ngs.noaa.gov

External links

 
 
 
 

Geodesy
National Geodetic Survey